End of Watch is a 2012 American action thriller film written and directed by David Ayer. It stars Jake Gyllenhaal and Michael Peña as Brian Taylor and Mike Zavala, two Los Angeles Police Department officers who work in South Central Los Angeles. The film focuses on their day-to-day police work, their dealings with a certain group of gang members, their friendship with each other, and their personal relationships.

Ayer, who had written several police procedural films previously, wanted the film to focus more on the friendship between partners and daily police work and subordinate the contextual elements of the drug trafficking story taking place on the streets of south-central LA. Gyllenhaal, Peña, and other cast members underwent an intensive training program to prepare for their roles as police officers. Filming took place in Los Angeles in August 2011 with a budget of $7 million.

End of Watch premiered on September 8, 2012, at the Toronto International Film Festival and was released in American theaters on September 21, grossing over $57 million at the box office. The film received a number of accolades, including two Independent Spirit Award nominations.

As of 2022, a series adaptation of End of Watch is being developed by Fox Entertainment.

Plot

Los Angeles Police Department officers Brian Taylor and Mike Zavala are close friends and partners in the high crime area of South Central in the Newton Division of the LAPD. Taylor, a Marine Corps veteran, records their activities for a college class after they return to duty from a recent officer-involved shooting.

Upon responding to a public disturbance call, Tre, a Bloods gang member, yells racial insults at Zavala, who responds by accepting a one-on-one fist fight. Zavala wins and earns Tre's respect for not charging him with assault. Later that night, Tre and his fellow Bloods are attacked in a drive-by shooting by the hispanic Curbside Gang. The following night, the officers respond to a noise complaint at a house party where Taylor and Zavala encounter Curbside Gang members "Big Evil" and "LaLa". Taylor and Zavala rescue children from a house fire while on patrol and are awarded the Medal of Valor.

During a traffic stop, they arrest a man who is in possession of several ornate firearms and large amounts of cash. Taylor urges Zavala to join him in investigating further, leading them to another man guarding a home full of human trafficking victims. When ICE agents intervene, the officers learn that the house is tied to the Sinaloa Cartel and are strongly urged to stay clear due to possible reprisals. Taylor soon becomes engaged to his girlfriend Janet and Zavala's wife Gabby gives birth to their first child.

One night, Taylor and Zavala respond to a call from their rookie fellow officer, Sook, and find her partner Van Hauser has been stabbed through the eye. They find and rescue Sook, who was being savagely beaten nearby. Taylor marries Janet, and at their wedding Zavala tells Taylor that, should anything happen to him, he will take care of Janet. The next day, the officers perform a wellness check on an elderly woman. In her house, they discover large amounts of heroin, dismembered corpses, and a message from the cartel. Unbeknownst to them, ICE has eavesdropped on a phone call from the cartel in Mexico and hears the two officers have been "green-lit"; Big Evil, LaLa, and others are tasked with killing them.

While on patrol the officers encounter Tre who as a favor from their earlier encounter warns them that some friends who were recently released from Folsom prison learned that both officers were green-lit, but Taylor and Zavala shrug it off. Taylor reveals to Zavala that Janet is pregnant. They are baited into chasing a reckless driver into an apartment complex where they are ambushed by the Curbside Gang. They fight their way into an alley where Taylor is shot in the chest. As Zavala desperately attends to his partner, the assassins arrive and shoot him several times in the back. Police backup eventually arrives, and the gangsters are killed after refusing to surrender.

Taylor survives, having been shielded by Zavala's body. At Zavala's funeral, Taylor tries to deliver a eulogy, but only manages to say a few words. In a flashback to the day of the shooting, Zavala recounts to Taylor a humorous story from the first time he and his wife slept together, before the two receive a call from dispatch.

Cast

Police
 Jake Gyllenhaal as Officer Brian Taylor
 Michael Peña as Officer Miguel 'Mike Z' Zavala
 David Harbour as Officer Van Hauser
 Frank Grillo as Sergeant
 Jaime Fitzsimons as Captain Reese
 America Ferrera as Officer Orozco
 Cody Horn as Officer Davis
 Kristy Wu as Officer Sook

Family
 Natalie Martinez as Gabriella 'Gabby' Zavala
 Anna Kendrick as Janet Taylor

Criminals
 Cle Shaheed Sloan as 'Tre'
 Shondrella Avery as 'Bonita'
 Maurice Compte as 'Big Evil'
 Flakiss as 'La-La'
 Richard Cabral as 'Demon'
 Diamonique as 'Wicked'

Production

David Ayer, who wrote and directed End of Watch, grew up in South Central Los Angeles and has had numerous friends in the LAPD. He had written several films previously about police officers in Los Angeles, but while these depicted rogue and corrupt officers, he wanted to feature honest, ethical police work in End of Watch. In contrast to his previous works, Ayer wanted to focus on the friendship between Taylor and Zavala and "have all the cop stuff drop away and become secondary to the chemistry of these guys". Ayer wrote the screenplay over six days in December 2010. Jaime FitzSimons, a longtime friend of Ayer and a former police officer with the LAPD, served as the film's technical advisor, and his experiences from working in Los Angeles inspired several plot points of the film.

Jake Gyllenhaal was the first to be cast in the film; after receiving the script, he read it in an hour and immediately contacted Ayer. Michael Peña was cast shortly after, following a string of auditions. He and Gyllenhaal did not bond immediately but gradually became close friends over the process of training and filming. Gyllenhaal and Peña undertook five months of intensive training under the guidance of FitzSimons to prepare for their roles—this included 12-hour ride-alongs with multiple Greater Los Angeles Area law enforcement agencies up to three times a week, as well as training in hand-to-hand combat, police tactics and weapons. On his first ride-along, Gyllenhaal witnessed a murder during a drug bust. Tactical training was also given to the other actors playing police officers, including David Harbour, America Ferrera, Cody Horn, and Frank Grillo.

End of Watch was filmed on location in South Central Los Angeles, primarily in the area of the LAPD's Newton Division, one of the most violent and gang-affiliated areas of the city. Filming took place over 22 days in August 2011, with a budget of $7.5 million. The film was shot in a combination of found footage style and traditional photography. Most scenes were captured by four cameras simultaneously: these included a handheld camera operated by Gyllenhaal, cameras clipped to Gyllenhaal and Peña's vests, and dashboard footage from their patrol car. Some scenes were shot entirely by Gyllenhaal. An alternate ending of the film was shot where both of the main characters died, but Ayer ultimately chose to retain the original ending.

Release

The world premiere of End of Watch was held on September 8, 2012, at the Toronto International Film Festival. It was originally scheduled to be released theatrically on September 28, 2012, but the release was later moved to September 21.

Home media
End of Watch was released on DVD and Blu-ray on January 22, 2013, by Universal Studios Home Entertainment.

Reception

Box office
End of Watch grossed $41 million in North America and $16.6 million in other territories for a total gross of $57.6 million, against its budget of $7 million.

In its opening weekend in the United States, the film grossed $13.1 million, finishing first at the box office. It was especially popular among Hispanics, who made up 32% of the audience on the opening weekend, and a writer for The Hollywood Reporter attributed the film's popularity to strong word of mouth. The film was initially released in 2,730 theaters and expanded to 2,780 locations in its second week of release. On December 7, the film was given a nationwide re-release in 1,259 theaters shortly after it received two Independent Spirit Award nominations. On the first weekend of its re-release, it grossed $752,000.

Critical response
On review aggregator Rotten Tomatoes the film has an 85% approval rating based on 181 reviews, with an average rating of 7.20/10. The website's consensus states: "End of Watch has the energy, devotion to characters, and charismatic performances to overcome the familiar pitfalls of its genre and handheld format." On Metacritic, the film has a score of 68 out of 100, based on reviews from 37 critics, indicating "generally favorable reviews". Audiences polled by CinemaScore gave the film an average grade of "A−" on an A+ to F scale.

Roger Ebert of the Chicago Sun-Times gave the film 4 out of 4 stars, calling it "one of the best police movies in recent years, a virtuoso fusion of performances and often startling action", and went on to name the film the fourth best of 2012. Film critic James Berardinelli described End of Watch as "satisfying and emotionally potent ... a good, gritty drama of the sort that seems increasingly rare within the thriller genre", giving the film 3.5 out of 4 stars. Olly Richards, writing for Empire, gave the film 4 out of 5 stars and summarized it as "a collection of cop-movie clichés but presented with sufficient flair and strong performances that the ride is enough, even if it's on rails". While New York Bilge Ebiri found the film largely unrealistic and Ayer's direction "serviceable at best", he wrote that "Ayer and his cast appear to have so convincingly nailed the way these characters talk and act that you might not even notice the film slipping from workaday grit into out-and-out myth."

Critics praised End of Watch for its avoidance of clichés often used in police films, particularly the buddy cop genre. Peter Debruge of Variety wrote that "Like a knife in the eye, End of Watch cuts past the cliches of standard police procedurals" and praised Ayer for depicting the LAPD as "an honorable and efficient organization of people working together". Entertainment Weekly Lisa Schwarzbaum, who gave the film an A−, described it as "one of the best American cop movies I've seen in a long time [and] also one of the few I've seen that pay serious attention to what cop life feels like, both on and off duty". In a review for The Globe and Mail, however, Rick Groen opined that the focus on "saintly" police officers was less interesting than Ayer's "trademark grit and authenticity".

The performances of Peña and Gyllenhaal were also praised by critics. Peter Debruge commended the realism that the two actors brought to their roles, saying, "Gyllenhaal and Peña so completely reinvent themselves in-character. Instead of wearing the roles like costumes or uniforms, they let the job seep into their skin." The Los Angeles Times Betsy Sharkey applauded the chemistry between the two lead actors, as well as their individual performances, writing, "As good as Gyllenhaal is in this, Peña nearly steals the show." In a review for USA Today, Claudia Puig commended Gyllenhaal for "giv[ing] his best performance since Brokeback Mountain" and Peña for "shin[ing] with charisma". Roger Ebert highlighted End of Watch as "one of the performances of [Peña's] career" and praised the performances given by the supporting cast, including Natalie Martinez and Anna Kendrick.

An aspect of the film criticized in numerous reviews was its handheld camerawork and cinematography. Richard Corliss wrote for Time that the found footage style of cinematography "borders on the ludicrous" and that "the tactic fatally substitutes photo realism for fauxto realism". Similarly, The Washington Post Michael O'Sullivan found the aesthetic gimmicky, overused, and "an unnecessary distraction from the story". On the other hand, Amy Biancolli of the San Francisco Chronicle felt that although the cinematography was inconsistent, "it's used to deepen its main characters" and "lends the film a lively intimacy".

Other reviewers criticized the casting of minorities as gang members. Manohla Dargis of The New York Times pointed out that "almost all of [the crimes are] committed by the black and mainly brown people", while The Globe and Mail Rick Groen criticized "the script's penchant for over demonizing the ghetto's black residents".

Accolades

References

External links
 
 
 
 

2012 films
2012 action thriller films
2012 crime drama films
2012 crime thriller films
2012 independent films
2010s English-language films
2010s American films
2010s Mexican films
2010s buddy cop films
American action thriller films
American crime drama films
American crime thriller films
American buddy cop films
American independent films
Buddy drama films
Found footage films
Hood films
MoviePass Films films
Exclusive Media films
Open Road Films films
StudioCanal films
Fictional portrayals of the Los Angeles Police Department
Films about Mexican drug cartels
Films scored by David Sardy
Films directed by David Ayer
Films with screenplays by David Ayer
Films set in 2011
Films set in Los Angeles
Films shot in Los Angeles